Sennaya Ploshchad (Sennaya Square) is a station on the Moskovsko-Petrogradskaya Line of Saint Petersburg Metro.

History
The station opened on 1 July 1963. It is a deep underground pylon station. Its surface vestibule is situated near Sennaya Square, which gives its name to the station. The historic Saviour Church on Sennaya Square was demolished in 1961 prior to the construction of the vestibule, although it ended up located in a different place. In 1952, Sennaya Square was renamed Ploshchad Mira and the new station was given that name. The historic name of the square was restored in 1992, and the metro station was also renamed. In June 1999, the concrete canopy of the surface vestibule collapsed, killing seven. The station is connected to the station Spasskaya of the Pravoberezhnaya Line and Sadovaya of the Frunzensko-Primorskaya Line via an underground transfer corridor.

On 3 April 2017, a suicide bomber blew himself up on a train between stations Sennaya Ploschad and Tekhnologichesky Institut, leaving 14 people dead and at least 49 people injured.

References

External links
 

Saint Petersburg Metro stations
Railway stations in Russia opened in 1963
1963 establishments in the Soviet Union
Railway stations located underground in Russia